Chamissoa  is a genus of flowering plants in the family Amaranthaceae of the Caryophyllales order.

The genus was named in honor of 19th century botanist Adelbert von Chamisso, by Carl Sigismund Kunth.  Its native to North and South America.

This genus is sometimes included in the family Chenopodiaceae.

Species
Species include:
Chamissoa acuminata
Chamissoa altissima (Jacq.) Kunth - False chaff flower

References

Amaranthaceae
Amaranthaceae genera
Adelbert von Chamisso